St. Patrick - St. Anthony Church is a Cathedral-style Church located at 265 Church Street, Hartford, CT. The church is part of the Roman Catholic Archdiocese of Hartford. It is the oldest Roman Catholic parish in the state of Connecticut.

The main church was added to the National Register of Historic Places in a Multiple Property Submission study of Ann Street Historic District Complexes in 1984.

History
The parish that would become Saint Patrick parish was founded to serve an influx of Irish immigrants to Hartford in 1829, making it the oldest permanent parish in both Hartford and the state of Connecticut as whole. At the time, Connecticut was still part of the part of the Diocese of Boston; the Diocese of Hartford would not be established until 1843. In 1830, the newly erected parish bought the recently vacated old Christ Church Episcopal church building, and moved it to the corner of Talcott Street and Main Street. This building was consecrated for Catholic worship as Holy Trinity Church (not to be confused with the 1903 Catholic church of the same name on Capitol Avenue in Hartford).

In 1850, construction on the original St. Patrick's Church at the corner of Church Street and Anne Street was begun by John Brady. In 1853, the original Holy Trinity Church building on Talcott Street caught fire and was destroyed. The newly built 1850s Saint Patrick Church on Church Street itself burnt down in January 1875. Mass was held in Allyn Hall while the church was being rebuilt on the Church Street site. 

The second Saint Patrick Church on Church Street was dedicated by Bishop Thomas Galberry on November 19, 1876, and consecrated in November 1885. The 1876 church was seriously damaged by another fire in 1956. In 1958, Saint Patrick parish was merged with nearby Saint Anthony parish, and the newly merged parish rebuilt the current Saint Patrick-Saint Anthony Church within the walls of the gutted 1876's building. 

St. Anthony's was the founded as the national parish for the Italian community of Hartford in the 1890s. When the founding pastor, Angelo Chicaglione, returned to Italy in February 1895, he was succeeded by his assistant, Edward Flannery. The parish moved to Market Street in 1921, however the new building was seriously damaged by flooding in 1936 and 1938. In the 1950s, redevelopment eliminated much of the Italian neighborhood served by St. Anthony. After Saint Anthony parish was merged with Saint Patrick parish in 1958, the Market Street church building was sold to the city and demolished for redevelopment.

In 1990, the Franciscan Friars were invited to serve at the parish, and begin an urban outreach ministry.

References 

Roman Catholic churches in Hartford, Connecticut
Roman Catholic churches completed in 1849
1829 establishments in Connecticut
Religious organizations established in 1829
19th-century Roman Catholic church buildings in the United States